Nathan Davis (born 15 November 1995) is an Australian rugby league footballer who most recently played for the Parramatta Eels in the National Rugby League. He has previously played for the Gold Coast Titans.

Background
Born in Sydney, New South Wales, Davis is of Indigenous Australian descent. He played his junior rugby league for the Hinchinbrook Hornets and Mount Pritchard Mounties, before being signed by the Parramatta Eels.

Playing career

Early career
In September and November 2013, Davis played for the Australian Schoolboys. In 2014 and 2015, he played for the Parramatta Eels' NYC team.

2016
In 2016, Davis joined the Gold Coast Titans. In round 1 of the 2016 NRL season, he made his NRL debut for the Titans against the Newcastle Knights.

2017
In March, Davis rejoined the Eels after gaining a release from his Titans contract. Parramatta exercised an option to extend Davis until the end of the 2018 season. He made his debut for Parramatta against the North Queensland Cowboys in Darwin on 10 June 2017.  Davis made no further appearances for Parramatta in The 2017 season and spent the rest of the year with Wentworthville in The Intrust Super Premiership NSW competition.

2018
In 2018, Davis spent the entire season with the Wentworthville Magpies after being unable to break into the Parramatta first grade team.
f>

References

External links
Parramatta Eels profile
Eels profile

1995 births
Living people
Australian rugby league players
Indigenous Australian rugby league players
Gold Coast Titans players
Parramatta Eels players
Wentworthville Magpies players
Mount Pritchard Mounties players
Rugby league centres
Rugby league wingers
Rugby league fullbacks
Rugby league players from Sydney